The Āwhitu Peninsula is a long peninsula in the North Island of New Zealand, extending north from the mouth of the Waikato River to the entrance to Manukau Harbour.

The Peninsula is bounded in the west by rugged cliffs over the Tasman Sea, but it slopes gently to the west, with low-lying pastoral and swamp land along the edge of the Waiuku River and Manukau Harbour. At the northern tip, the Manukau Heads rises to a  prominence above the entrance to the similarly named harbour. The nearby historic Manukau Heads Lighthouse is one of the few in the country open to the public.

The largest settlement on or near the peninsula is Waiuku, which lies at the peninsula's isthmus. There are rural settlements at Grahams Beach and Matakawau Point.

Geology

The Āwhitu Peninsula was formed geologically recently, from black volcanic sand from eruptions of Mount Taranaki mixed with white quartz and pumice sand, carried from the Waikato River. Prior to this, the Manukau Harbour was an extensive bay. The peninsula is a sand dune which developed over the last two million years.

Historically much of the peninsula was native forest dominated by taraire, with significant numbers of kauri, pūriri, tawa, karaka, kohekohe, tītoki, tōtara and kahikatea.

History

The peninsula is named after the traditional settlement of Āwhitu, located to the west of Orua Bay. The name refers to the regret Hoturoa, captain of the Tainui migratory canoe, felt as he left the area. The area has strong significance for Ngāti Te Ata Waiohua, and is the location of Tāhuna Marae.

The west coast of the Āwhitu Peninsula is the former site of Paorae, a flat sand dune land which was a major kūmara (sweet potato) cultivation area for Tāmaki Māori iwi.  The land eroded during the 18th century. The northern shore of the Āwhitu Peninsula around the Manukau Heads is one of the earliest archaeological sites in the Auckland region.

In 1834, a Wesleyan mission was established at Orua Bay on the peninsula by William Woon. On 20 March 1840, Orua Bay became one of the locations where the Treaty of Waitangi was signed, by Manukau and Waikato chiefs. During the event, Apihai Te Kawau of Ngāti Whātua signed, but several Waikato Tainui chiefs refused.

From 1835, the kauri forest on the peninsula was logged. During the early colonial period, the native bush of the peninsula was converted to farmland. Between 1870 and 1900, the peninsula, alongside neighbouring Waiuku and Karaka were major centres for the kauri gum industry.

Demographics

Āwhitu had a population of 2,919 at the 2018 New Zealand census, an increase of 408 people (16.2%) since the 2013 census, and an increase of 381 people (15.0%) since the 2006 census. There were 1,107 households, comprising 1,467 males and 1,452 females, giving a sex ratio of 1.01 males per female. The median age was 47.4 years (compared with 37.4 years nationally), with 525 people (18.0%) aged under 15 years, 387 (13.3%) aged 15 to 29, 1,512 (51.8%) aged 30 to 64, and 492 (16.9%) aged 65 or older.

Ethnicities were 89.6% European/Pākehā, 12.8% Māori, 2.8% Pacific peoples, 3.8% Asian, and 1.7% other ethnicities. People may identify with more than one ethnicity.

The percentage of people born overseas was 17.0, compared with 27.1% nationally.

Although some people chose not to answer the census's question about religious affiliation, 60.7% had no religion, 26.5% were Christian, 0.3% had Māori religious beliefs, 0.9% were Hindu, 0.3% were Buddhist and 2.1% had other religions.

Of those at least 15 years old, 312 (13.0%) people had a bachelor's or higher degree, and 522 (21.8%) people had no formal qualifications. The median income was $34,700, compared with $31,800 nationally. 516 people (21.6%) earned over $70,000 compared to 17.2% nationally. The employment status of those at least 15 was that 1,236 (51.6%) people were employed full-time, 354 (14.8%) were part-time, and 75 (3.1%) were unemployed.

Education

Biodiversity 
The Peninsula has a high sympatric diversity of native New Zealand land snails. Communities of >70 native species in a 4 ha patch of bush can be found here, whereas in other parts of the world, 15 sympatric land snail species would be considered high. Grazing and other habitat disturbances can negatively impact this diversity.

References

Peninsulas of the Auckland Region
Populated places in the Auckland Region
Populated places around the Manukau Harbour
Kauri gum